Diadegma consumtor is a wasp first described by Johann Ludwig Christian Gravenhorst in 1829.No subspecies are listed.

References

consumtor
Taxa named by Johann Ludwig Christian Gravenhorst
Insects described in 1829